The Numbers is a film industry data website that tracks box office revenue in a systematic, algorithmic way. The company also conducts research services and forecasts incomes of film projects.

History 
The site was launched in 1997 by Bruce Nash.

On March 21, 2020, the Numbers released a statement that because of movie theater closures due to the COVID-19 pandemic, "We don’t expect much box office reporting in the short term" and did not report the usual daily box office estimates due to lack of box office data from film studios.

See also 
 Box Office Mojo
 Lumiere

References

External links 
 
  The Numbers Bankability Index

1997 establishments in California
Companies based in Beverly Hills, California
Film box office
American film websites
Internet properties established in 1997
Online film databases